Australian Recording Industry Association (ARIA) are an Australian music industry trade group.

ARIA may also refer to:

 ARIA (cipher), a block cipher algorithm developed in South Korea and described in RFC 5794
 Advanced Research and Invention Agency, or ARIA, a research funding agency of the UK government
 Allergic Rhinitis and its Impact on Asthma, an initiative for publishing guidelines on treatment of allergic rhinitis
 Amyloid-related imaging abnormalities, a side effect of some amyloid-targeting drugs
 A/RIA, Apollo / Range Instrumentation Aircraft, later ARIA, Advanced Range Instrumentation Aircraft, a Boeing EC-135 Stratolifter
 Audio and Radio Industry Awards, annual awards for excellence in UK radio and audio presenting and production.
 Australian Reward Investment Alliance, a superannuation trustee for Australian Government employees

Other uses
 WAI-ARIA (Web Accessibility Initiative – Accessible Rich Internet Applications), a technical specification that specifies how to increase the accessibility of web pages

See also
 
 Aria (disambiguation)